Nesvadba (feminine Nesvadbová) is a Czech-language surname. Notable people with the surname include:

 Bára Nesvadbová, Czech writer
 Jaroslav Nesvadba, Czech footballer
 Josef Nesvadba, Czech writer
 Josef Nesvadba (diver), Czechoslovak diver

Czech-language surnames